"Greasy Jungle" is a song by Canadian rock band The Tragically Hip. It was released in November 1994 as the second single from the band's fourth studio album, Day for Night. At the time of its release, the song was the band's highest charting single ever in Canada, peaking at No. 8 on the RPM Canadian Singles Chart.

Charts

Weekly charts

Year-end charts

References

External links

 The Tragically Hip Website

1994 singles
The Tragically Hip songs
1994 songs